Chrysallactis is a genus of moths in the family Erebidae. The genus was erected by George Hampson in 1900.

Species
Chrysallactis aureorubra Hampson, 1900
Chrysallactis pulchra Röber, 1925

References

Nudariina
Moth genera